The Final of the 2010 Super 14 season, a provincial rugby union competition in the Southern Hemisphere, took place on 29 May 2010 at Orlando Stadium in Soweto, South Africa. The Bulls, based in Pretoria, hosted the Stormers, from Cape Town, in the second all-South African final. The defending champion Bulls won 25–17 to claim their second consecutive title and third in four years. This was the last Super 14 final, as the Melbourne Rebels joined the Super Rugby competition in the 2011 season to create a new Super Rugby competition.

The Bulls' normal home, Loftus Versfeld, was unavailable because it was used as a venue for the 2010 FIFA World Cup being held in South Africa beginning 11 June. Under FIFA rules, all World Cup venues must be handed over to the local organisers no later than 15 days before the opening match of the competition. Orlando Stadium was the largest, suitable, stadium in the Bulls' home province of Gauteng that was not being used for the World Cup.

The game was surrounded in controversy after Schalk Burger claimed that the referee Craig Joubert was inconsistent at the breakdowns, "coaching the Bulls, but penalising the Stormers". This sparked an outcry over the handling of the game by Joubert, and internet blogs were buzzing due to the alleged incompetency of Joubert. André Watson, the head of South Africa's Rugby Referees, released a statement in which he defended Joubert's performance.

Road to the Final

Match

First half

Second half
The Stormers scored a try in the 77th minute of the game. This try was thought to have been awarded to Ricky Januarie. The television replays showed that in fact the ball was placed short of the try line, but Craig Joubert awarded the try without referring it to the television match official. SARU clarified the try in a press statement a few days later claiming that Januarie's attempt was short, but that the ball was picked up by replacement Pieter Louw who then scored the try.

Match details

Notes

References

Final
2010
2010 in South African rugby union
Stormers matches
Bulls (rugby union) matches